"Hidden Place" is a song recorded by Icelandic singer Björk for her fourth studio album Vespertine (2001). Written and produced by Björk herself, "Hidden Place" was released as the lead single from Vespertine on 30 July 2001 by One Little Indian Records.

Background
In 2000, while Björk worked on the film Dancer in the Dark, she also began producing her next album, writing new music and teaming with new collaborators; she has said "Selmasongs was the day job and Vespertine was the hobby". Her new relationship with artist Matthew Barney and the tension while filming Dancer in the Dark have been referred to as the two major forces that shaped what would become Vespertine. As the process of filming demanded her to be extroverted, the new music she was creating became hushed and tranquil as a way to escape. Björk commissioned Valgeir Sigurðsson to relocate some of his studio equipment from Iceland to Denmark, where Dancer in the Dark was being filmed. While living in Copenhagen she also contacted the electronic musician Thomas Knak (aka Opiate), after having enjoyed his 1999 album Objects for an Ideal Home. Björk's musical taste shifted from the "clang and clatter" and "thumping techno that characterized Homogenic, as she "was bored with big beats".

Björk then set to make a record with a domestic mood featuring "everyday moods and everyday noises translating into melodies and beats," hence its working title Domestika. As she wanted to write her own songs in music boxes, Björk contacted a music box company, requesting see-through acrylic glass boxes because she wanted it to sound "as hard as possible, like it was frozen." She also began to use her laptop to write music, and decided to use instruments whose sound wouldn't be compromised when downloaded from sites such as Napster. Björk completed: "I had loads and loads of beats for 'Hidden Place' but it still wasn't up enough. Matthew Herbert came for a visit in the studio and offered to do it. He ran away to his studio and came back after a few hours later with a DAT". She explains the song's title:
'Hidden Place' is sort of about how two people can create a paradise just by uniting. You've got an emotional location that's mutual. And it's unbreakable. And obviously it's make-believe. So, you could argue that it doesn't exist because it's invisible, but of course it does.

Music and lyrics
"Hidden Place" features choirs of space sirens, and lyrically is about a new love that has a private side. "I'm not sure what to do with it or where to put it/ I'll keep it in a hidden place", Björk sings. According to The Wire magazine, the song "hints at the extent to which her lyrics parallel their fragile musical arrangements: 'I'm so close to tears and so close to simply calling you up/ I'm simply suggesting/ We go to that hidden place'". For Ryan Schreiber of Pitchfork the track opens Vespertine with a "glitchy, almost lo-fi melodic loop, paired with the deep sub-bass attack that has dominated the low-end of Björk's music in recent years". MusicOMH's Michael Hubbard noted that it is reminiscent of Björk's previous single "Hunter" (1997), although he felt the beats were not "so central this time round".

Critical reception
"Hidden Place" received positive reviews from music critics. Greg Kot from Blender magazine commented that album openers "Hidden Place" and "Cocoon" "live up to their billing as sound sanctuaries, with Björk singing a barely-above-a-whisper lullaby enhanced by the plush embrace of a choir". David Fricke of Rolling Stone called it "floating beauty". British magazine NMEs Joe Logic was also positive saying, "'Hidden Place' is a mellow and low-key opener that combines Matmos sneezing-cricket beats with deep warm bass and a distant choir. The chorus is almost mantra-like, drawing you further into this immeasurably gorgeous record". However, Steve Granlee from The Boston Globe commented that "Hidden Place" was "a subtle update" of "Human Behaviour", but "it won't have any radio appeal". Katy Widder of PopMatters shared a similar sentiment, saying the song "is by no means top 40 material".

Music video
The music video for "Hidden Place" was directed by Inez van Lamsweerde and Vinoodh Matadin and co-directed by M/M Paris. It was shot in four days in February 2001 in London. It was originally planned for a song from Selmasongs, but Björk felt the project was more appropriate for Vespertine. The video consists of close-up shots panning around Björk's face, as fluids flow in and out of her facial orifices. M/M Paris explained the concept behind the video: "We always wanted to get as close to her as we could, as we all felt she had never been portrayed as the "real" and beautiful woman she is. This is somehow taboo, to observe a pop star with no makeup from a distance of half an inch. Then the idea of the liquid works as a visualization of all possible emotions pulsating and circulating in her very busy brain. The loop idea was a main point for us as well, trying to extend the usual time frame of pop video super-fast editing, to make it hypnotising, mesmerising and irritating, like an eternally burning fireplace."

Track listings
UK and European CD1
 "Hidden Place" (edit)
 "Generous Palmstroke"
 "Verandi"

UK and European CD2
 "Hidden Place" (acappella)
 "Mother Heroic"
 "Foot Soldier"

US and UK DVD single
 "Hidden Place" (video)
 "Generous Palmstroke"
 "Verandi"

Personnel
Credits adapted from Vespertine's liner notes.

 Written by Björk
 Programming – Jake Davies, Damian Taylor, Guy Sigsworth, Matthew Herbert, Matmos
 Bassline – Björk
 Choir arrangement – Björk, Guy Sigsworth and Vince Mendoza
 Pro Tools Recording engineer – Jake Davies and Damian Taylor
 Produced by Björk
 Mixed by Mark "Spike" Stent

Charts

Weekly charts

Year-end charts

Release history

References

Bibliography

External links
 Hidden Place webpage

2001 singles
2001 songs
Björk songs
Elektra Records singles
Number-one singles in Spain
One Little Indian Records singles
Polydor Records singles
Song recordings produced by Björk
Songs written by Björk
UK Independent Singles Chart number-one singles